The Stimson Sting is a three-wheeled car designed by Barry Stimson. Available as a kit car, it was introduced in the UK in 2002 and continued in production until 2007, although only one was built in that time. It has two wheels at the front and two seats.

The Sting uses the  powertrain of the Suzuki Bandit 1200 motorcycle, giving it a 0– acceleration of under four seconds.

See also
List of motorized trikes

References

Citations

Bibliography

External links
Video of the Stimson Sting

Three-wheeled motor vehicles
Cars introduced in 2002